John Wallace Kilmer (born June 6, 1995) is an American actor. He is known for starring in the 2013 film Palo Alto, for playing Pelle "Dead" Ohlin in the 2018 Norwegian black metal biopic Lords of Chaos, and for playing Ozzy Osbourne in Ozzy's "Under the Graveyard" video. He is also the narrator of Val, a documentary about his father Val Kilmer.

Early life
Kilmer, born to actors Joanne Whalley and Val Kilmer, grew up in Los Angeles and attended primary school at The Center for Early Education, where he met would-be filmmaker Gia Coppola (he was in the first grade; she was in the sixth).

Career
Coppola asked him to review her script for Palo Alto, a film adaptation of James Franco's book of the same name which she also planned to direct. She asked him to advise whether the dialog was an authentic reflection of "kids today". After he ran through a table read with her, she encouraged him to audition for one of the film's main roles, Teddy. Coppola filmed him as he read through the lines and this became his audition tape; he eventually won the role. After he was cast as Teddy, his father, actor Val Kilmer, joined the cast as the father of another character. Before filming Palo Alto when he was 16 years old, Kilmer had never acted before, and did not aspire to be an actor.

The film was released in May 2014 to mostly positive reviews, and Kilmer's performance was described as "formidable", "naturalistic and sincere".

Kilmer graduated from high school in 2013. He intended for his acting job on Palo Alto to be a brief project before applying to colleges, but after the film's production he decided to enter acting full-time. In April 2014, he filmed Len and Company with Juno Temple and Rhys Ifans. He played Chet, a young film projectionist who proves vital to the investigation in the 2016 neo-noir crime buddy comedy film The Nice Guys, which was written and directed by Shane Black, who had previously worked with Kilmer's father Val on the 2005 crime buddy comedy Kiss Kiss Bang Bang.

In 2014, Kilmer also dipped into the high-fashion modeling world, posing for portraits in Saint Laurent's Permanent Collection, as well as walking the runway in the brand's 2015 spring-summer show. 

Kilmer provided extensive narration for the 2021 documentary Val, which details the life of his father. In reviewing the documentary, many critics noted the similarity in voice between Kilmer and his father as a young man. The film premiered on Amazon Prime on August 6, 2021 following a screening at the Cannes Film Festival.

Personal life
Kilmer enjoys surfing and skateboarding. He is a musician, playing guitar and drums, and was previously in a band called Glimmer. He also occasionally DJs at a club in Los Angeles.

Filmography

Film

Television

Music videos

References

External links

1995 births
21st-century American male actors
American male film actors
American male voice actors
American people of English descent
American people of French descent
American people of German descent
American people of Irish descent
American people of Scotch-Irish descent
American people of Swedish descent
American people of Welsh descent
Living people
Male actors from Los Angeles